The 2012–13 Siena Saints men's basketball team represented Siena College during the 2012–13 NCAA Division I men's basketball season. The Saints, led by third year head coach Mitch Buonaguro, played their home games at the Times Union Center and were members of the Metro Atlantic Athletic Conference. They finished the season 8–24, 4–14 in MAAC play to finish in ninth place. They lost in the quarterfinals of the MAAC tournament to Niagara.

Following the season, head coach Mitch Buonaguro was fired after posting a record of 35–59 in three seasons.

Roster

Schedule

|-
!colspan=9| Exhibition

|-
!colspan=9| Regular season

|-
!colspan=9| 2013 MAAC men's basketball tournament

References

Siena Saints men's basketball seasons
Siena
Siena Saints men's basketball
Siena Saints men's basketball